China Lake, California may refer to:
Naval Air Weapons Station China Lake, airborne weapons testing and training range operated by the United States Navy
China Lake, Kern County, California
China Lake Acres, California, census-designated place (CDP) in Kern County, California, United States